The 1984–85 John Player Cup was the 14th edition of England's premier rugby union club competition at the time. Bath won the competition for the second consecutive year defeating London Welsh in the final. The event was sponsored by John Player cigarettes and the final was held at Twickenham Stadium.

Draw and results

First round

+Result from Sat 22 Sep missing

Second round

Third round

Away team progress*

Fourth round

Quarter-finals

Coventry progress due to more tries*

Semi-finals

London Welsh progress due to more tries*

Final

References

1984–85 rugby union tournaments for clubs
1984–85 in English rugby union
RFU Knockout Cup